Jericho Creek is a tributary of Flat Fork Creek in Shelby County, Texas in the United States.

References

Rivers of Texas